The  Washington Redskins season was the franchise's 67th season in the National Football League (NFL) and their 62nd in Washington, D.C. The team failed to improve on their 8–7–1 and finished fourth in the NFC East, with a record of 6–10 and missed the NFL playoffs for the sixth consecutive year. They started the season 0–7, before going 6–3 after their bye week.

After ranking 28th out of 30 NFL teams in defense against the run in 1997, the Redskins had tried to revamp their interior defensive line during the off-season. They had signed Dana Stubblefield from the San Francisco 49ers, and Dan Wilkinson from the Cincinnati Bengals. The acquisitions, in particular Stubblefield's, were eventually considered to have been costly failures though.

Offseason

NFL Draft

Personnel

Staff

Roster

Regular season

Schedule 

Note: Intra-division opponents are in bold text.

Standings

References 

Washington
Washington Redskins seasons
Red